Zouheïra Salem (died 27 December 2020) was a Tunisian singer. She was part of the same generation of singers as Naâma, Oulaya, and Safia Chamia. Her most famous song, Baja bled el mandara wa sabba, was a tribute to her hometown of Béja. She died on 27 December 2020 in Tunis.

References

External links
 Entry at discogs. com

20th-century Tunisian women singers
People from Béja
2020 deaths
Year of birth missing